Max S. Hayes High School is a public high school located in Cleveland, Ohio, United States. It is part of the Cleveland Metropolitan School District. The school is a career training school with several vocational and career-based programs, otherwise known as a trade school. Students can go there to learn a trade. The current location on West 65th Street opened in August 2015, replacing the previous facility on Detroit Avenue, which opened in 1957.

Name
Max S. Hayes High School is named in honor of Max S. Hayes, a longtime Cleveland newspaper editor, labor activist, and 1920 vice presidential candidate of the Farmer-Labor Party.

The school was also the first home for public television station WVIZ, which was launched by CMSD.

Notable alumni
 Frank G. Jackson, Mayor of Cleveland

References

External links
 District website
Max S. Hayes High School available on Cleveland Public Library Digital Gallery, various years 1974 through 2008 

High schools in Cuyahoga County, Ohio
Education in Cleveland
Public high schools in Ohio
Cleveland Metropolitan School District
Educational institutions established in 1950
School buildings completed in 1957
School buildings completed in 2015